Lagoa Municipality may refer to:
 Lagoa Municipality (Algarve)
 Lagoa Municipality (Azores)

Municipality name disambiguation pages